Mambéty For Ever  is a 2008 documentary film.

Synopsis 
A film made in Cameroon and France about the life and work of filmmaker Djibril Diop Mambéty, with testimonials from filmmakers Abderrahmane Sissako, Newton Aduaka and Mahamat-Saleh Haroun, Cheick Fantamady Camara, Mahama Johnson Traoré; critics  Catherine Ruelle, Thierno I. Dia and Brice Ahounou; Cameroonian actor  Gérard Essomba;  Mambéty's brother,  Wasis Diop; and his son, Teemour Diop.

References

External links

2008 films
2008 documentary films
French documentary films
Cameroonian documentary films
Documentary films about film directors and producers
Documentary films about African cinema
2000s French films